Edward Foreman (1937 – 2018) was an American operatic bass, scholar of singing technique, and teacher. He was founder and editor of the Pro Musica Press (Minneapolis), which reprinted historical treatises in facsimile and transcription, and also translated them into English.
According to Richard Wistreich, these translations offer a uniquely comprehensive and valuable collection of Bel Canto pedagogy in English. He argues that "a growing number of influential singing teachers […] agree [with Foreman]", that there should be a revival of those old, healthy, singing practices.

Publications
 Transformative Voice, ProMusica Press, 1996,  
 Voice without technique, a manual for singers and teachers, ProMusica Press, 1998, 
 R M Bacon,  Elements of Vocal Science, ProMusica Press, 1966, 
 Mancini, Gianbattista, Practical reflections on figured singing (1774 & 1777) ProMusica Press, 1967, 
 The Porpora Tradition, (Corri, The singer’s preceptor Vols 1&2, 1811 and Isaac Nathan, Musurgia Vocalis 1816) ProMusica Press, 1968 OCLC 39944
 Tosi, Pierfrancesco: Opinions of singers, Ancient and Modern, or Observations on Figured Singing, ProMusica Press, 1993, 
 Pellegrini, Anna Maria, Grammar, or, Rules for singing well, ProMusica Press, 2001, 
 Late renaissance singing : Giovanni Camillo Maffei, Discourse on the voice and the method of learning to sing ornamentation, without a teacher (1562) ; Lodovico Zacconi, the practice of music, book one, chapters LVIII-LXXX (1592) ; Giovanni Battista Bovicelli, Rules, passages of music (1594); Giovanni Luca Conforto, Brief and easy method ... (1603?) with English translation  ProMusica Press, 2001, 
 Authentic Singing, Being The History and Practice Of the Art of Singing And Teaching in Two Volumes   ProMusica Press, 2001, 
  Giuseppe Aprile, The modern Italian method of singing : with a variety of progressive examples & thirty six solfeggi,    ProMusica Press, 2001, 
 The Art of bel canto in the Italian Baroque: A study of the original sources,  ProMusica Press, 2006,  
 A bel canto Method or How to Sing Italian Baroque Music Correctly Based on the Primary Sources,  ProMusica Press, 2006,

Recordings
 Dominick Argento, Postcard from Morocco, conductor Philip Brunelle, Orchestra of the Centre Opera Company (Minnesota Opera), Desto Records, 1972, complete opera

References

1937 births
2018 deaths
American operatic basses
American writers about music